Band is a surname of German origin and may refer to:

 Albert Band (1924–2002), film director and producer
 Alex Band (born 1981), musician
 Charles Band (born 1951), film director, writer and producer
 David Louis Band (1957–2009), astronomer
 Doug Band (born 1972), aide and counselor
 George Band (1929-2011), British mountaineer
 Jonathon Band (born 1950), First Sea Lord
 Max Band (1901–1974), landscape artist
 Richard Band (born 1953), composer
 Elena Waiss Band (1908-1988), Chilean pianist

References 

German-language surnames
Jewish surnames